SPORTS for Exceptional Athletes is a San Diego, California-based nonprofit athletic organization, created to provide enhanced opportunities for people with and without disabilities. The primary mission of SPORTS for Exceptional Athletes (S4EA) is to serve people with developmental disabilities within the age range of 5 years old through adults. By combining people with and without disabilities, S4EA hopes that participating athletes will interact and form lasting bonds of friendship through shared sports and recreational activities in S4EA's served communities. Although the organization's focus is primarily San Diego County, S4EA has grown from this base to satellite programs in Ventura and Temecula, California.

SPORTS for Exceptional Athletes offers a variety of sports, with the year divided into four sports seasons. These sports include: basketball, baseball, floor hockey, bowling, figure skating, golf, snowshoeing, judo, swimming, track & field, and more.

The organization—a 501(c)(3) California corporation—was founded in 2007 by a group of athletes, coaches, volunteers, and parents who split from Special Olympics Southern California to gain local control over disabled athletics programs.

Today, SPORTS for Exceptional Athletes serves more than 1,400 athletes.

References

External links 
 

Disability organizations based in the United States
Sports organizations established in 2007
Parasports organizations